A concrete curved-chord through girder bridge, sometimes known as a camelback bridge, is a type of concrete bridge most common in the U.S. state of Michigan and the Canadian province of Ontario. The type was designed by C.V. Dewart, the first professional bridge engineer of the Michigan State Highway Department. By the early 1920s, the Michigan State Highway Department had produced standardized designs for these bridges in lengths of 50, 60, 70, 75 and 90 feet. The first such bridge in Michigan was built in 1922 over the Raisin River at Tecumseh. By the end of the decade, the design fell out of favor since they could not be widened to handle increasing traffic.

, the longest surviving example in Michigan is the three-span,  US 12–St. Joseph River Bridge, built in 1922 in Mottville.

List of bridges
23 Mile Road–Kalamazoo River Bridge
Avery Road–Galien River Bridge
Lincoln Road–Pine River Bridge
Second Street–Gun River Bridge
Ten Curves Road–Manistique River Bridge
US 12–St. Joseph River Bridge
Wadhams Road–Pine River Bridge
Vernier Street–Swan Creek Bridge

Notes

References

 
Transportation in Michigan
Transport in Ontario